Alisha Klass (born January 3, 1972) is a former American pornographic actress.

Career
Klass began starring in pornographic movies around 1997, becoming the best known collaborator with director Seymore Butts, aka Adam Glasser, to whom she was once engaged. Klass had a tattoo on her rear reading "Seymore Butts." However, following an acrimonious break up in 2000 she has since had it covered with a dolphin. Tampa Tushy Fest, Part 1, a 1998 video featuring Klass in a lesbian fisting scene with Chloe Nicole, resulted in Glasser being charged with obscenity. Glasser pleaded public nuisance charge as part of an agreement with the  Los Angeles city attorney's office on 20 March 2002. He also paid a fine of 1000 dollars.

Other ventures
Klass has worked as a host on the Playboy television show, Inside Adult, and wrote a column for Club Confidential magazine.

Appearances
Klass had a brief cameo as a cheerleader in the movie Cruel Intentions in 1999. She appeared briefly as a dancer in the 2001 independent film The Center of the World. Klass has also made appearances on the Howard Stern Show, both television and radio, as well as various documentaries about the adult industry as herself including Porn Star: The Legend of Ron Jeremy in 2001.

Personal life
She studied directing and screenwriting at UCLA in 2001. She was engaged to Seymore Butts and briefly dated sports agent Dan Lozano.

Awards

References

External links

 
 
 
 

1972 births
American pornographic film actresses
Living people
People from Chino, California
Pornographic film actors from California
21st-century American women